The Brebu is a right tributary of the river Bâsca Mică in Romania.

References

Rivers of Romania
Rivers of Buzău County